Rhinastus is a genus of beetles belonging to the family Curculionidae.

Description
The species of this genus are generally large and broad weevils, quite flattened, yellowish, with very long beaks and legs and a striking sexual dimorphism.

List of Species
 Rhinastus elephas Dupont in Dejean, P.F.M.A., 1836 
 Rhinastus granulatus Roelofs, W., 1879 
 Rhinastus latisternus Guérin-Méneville, 1844 
 Rhinastus scolopax Dejean, P.F.M.A. 
 Rhinastus sternicornis Schoenherr, 1825

References 

 Catalogue of Life
 Zipcodezoo
 Patricia Vaurie Revision of Rhinastus and Description of a New Species of Cholus (Coleoptera, Curculionidae, Cholinae

Molytinae